Maurice Ravel composed his Violin Sonata No. 2 for violin and piano from 1923 to 1927. He was inspired by American music, namely jazz and blues.

Inspiration
When the composer was living in Montfort-l'Amaury, France, he accompanied Hélène Jourdan-Morhange, and they shared a love for jazz. The classic blues band of W. C. Handy exhibited the style of St. Louis blues in Paris from 1923 to 1927. Ravel was inspired by the style of music and dance, and jazz elements can also be found in the Piano Concerto for the Left Hand and other works.

Movements

The violin sonata consists of three movements:

References
Notes

Sources

Further reading

External links
 
 Performance of Violin Sonata No. 2 by Nicola Benedetti (violin) and Julien Quentin (piano) from the Isabella Stewart Gardner Museum in MP3 format

Compositions by Maurice Ravel
Ravel 02
1927 compositions
Compositions in G major